Kathryn Margaret Rudy FBA FRSE (born 25 February 1969) is a manuscript historian at the University of St Andrews, Scotland. She is best known for her forensic approach to medieval books, and has pioneered the use of the densitometer to measure the grime that original readers deposited in their books. Her research focuses on the medieval reception of manuscripts, how they were manipulated and handled, and how book-making skills were lost with the advent of the printing industry.

Rudy is a Professor in the School of Art History at the University of St Andrews and holds a Leverhulme Major Research Grant (2019-2022). She is a Fellow of the British Academy, Fellow of the Royal Society of Edinburgh and the recipient of its prestigious Sir Walter Scott medal. She has published five books and regularly contributes to scholarly journals. She performs lectures in the UK and internationally. In 2013 she delivered a TED talk about the secret lives of manuscripts. She is an advocate for digital-born humanities scholarship and open access publishing. Kathryn Rudy’s family hails from Erie, Pennsylvania.

Education 
In 2001 Rudy earned her Ph.D in Art History from Columbia University, where she studied with David Freedberg, Simon Schama, and James H. Marrow (at Princeton). She also holds a Licentiate in Mediaeval Studies from the University of Toronto, and a B.A. in English and History of Art from Cornell University (1992).

 St. Michael’s College, Toronto University of Toronto, MLS, Medieval Studies (2001 - 2002)
 Rare Book School, University of Virginia (1995 - 2001)
 Columbia University at the City of New York, Ph.D, History of Art (1992 - 2001)
 Cornell University, B.A., English and History of Art (1987 - 1992)

Career 
Before coming to St. Andrews in 2010, Rudy was Curator of Illuminated Manuscripts at the National Library of The Netherlands (The Hague). She has held research, teaching and curatorial positions in the US, UK, Canada, The Netherlands and Belgium. She was promoted to a professorship in the School of Art History at the University of St Andrews in August 2017.

 Trinity Long Room Hub Visiting Research Fellow, Trinity College Dublin (August 2010 - December 2010)
 Caroline Villers Associate Fellow, Courtauld Institute of Art (September 2009 - August 2010)
 Curator of Illuminated Manuscripts, Koninklijke Biblioteek (September 2006 - September 2009)
 Samuel H. Kress Fellow, The Warburg Institute (2005 - 2006)
 Assistant Professor, Semester At Sea/ISE (Institute for Seaboard Education) (2002)
 Fellow, Pontifical Institute of Mediaeval Studies, University of Toronto (2001 - 2002)
 Kress Fellow, Centre for Advanced Study in the Visual Arts (1999 - 2001)

Publications

Fellowships, awards and grants 

Rudy has held fellowships from the British Academy, the Bodleian Library, Oxford; the Getty Research Institute, and the Internationales Kolleg für Kulturtechnikforschung und Medienphilosophie (IKKM) at the Bauhaus-Universität Weimar, the Paul Mellon Centre for Studies in British Art (2017–18), the Netherlands Institute for Advanced Study in Amsterdam (2018–19). In 2019-22 held a Leverhulme Major Research Grant, exploring what the pollen and stains found in medieval manuscripts can tell us about their readers and how they were used. In 2019 she was elected Fellow of the Royal Society of Edinburgh. In January 2020 she was awarded the Royal Society of Edinburgh's Sir Walter Scott medal for her outstanding contribution to art history. In July 2022 she was elected Fellow of the British Academy.

References 

American women historians
21st-century American historians
1969 births
Living people
Academics of the University of St Andrews
Cornell University alumni
Columbia University alumni
University of St. Michael's College alumni
21st-century American women writers
Fellows of the British Academy
Fellows of the Royal Society of Edinburgh